Gibbera is a genus of fungi in the family Venturiaceae. It was first described scientifically by Elias Magnus Fries in 1825.

Species
 Gibbera andromedae
 Gibbera vaccinii

References

Venturiaceae